Conghua Coach Terminal station, is a station of Line 14 of the Guangzhou Metro. It opened on 28 December 2018.

Station Layout
The station has an underground island platform. Platform 1 is for trains heading to Dongfeng, whilst platform 2 is for trains heading to Jiahewanggang.

Gallery

References

 Railway stations in China opened in 2018
Guangzhou Metro stations